Shekar Kesh may refer to:
 Bala Shekar Kesh
 Mian Shekar Kesh
 Pain Shekar Kesh